Al Qadarif, also spelt Gadaref or Gadarif, is one of the 18 wilayat or states of Sudan. It has an area of 75,263 km2 and an estimated population of approximately 1,400,000 (2000). Al Qadarif is the capital of the state; other towns include Doka and Gallabat. It includes the disputed Al Fushqa District.

Demographics

Inhabiting Gedaref State of ethnic groups inside Sudan representing different tribes, and other related assets from outside Sudan, Eritreans and Ethiopians and Yemenis, Somalis, Chadian and Egyptian Copts, Armenians, Kurds and others. This diverse social structure have been formed because of the migrations that occurred during the period of Turkish rule and the Mahdist revolution and as a result of the evolution of the mechanism which caused the state's agriculture. These groups have merged and coexisted in a multicultural society.

The state is natural geographical area on the slopes of the Ethiopian plateau and descend towards the rivers, valleys and creeks loaded with water as well as enjoying the state with land of clay soil fertile and interspersed with some hills.

A distinction can be made between the three geomorphic regions:
 High land in the south east of the state on the Sudan-Ethiopia border, as well as some mountains and hills isolated chains.
 Plains is characterized by mud-flat lands and simple regression, and form appearance Altobgrave mostly in the state.
 And valleys area dominated by land-sedimentary about seasonal rivers (the Atbara River, State, Rahad River and the Islam)

Agriculture

The state is characterized by vast land suitable for agriculture, and the largest projects for rainfed agriculture in Sudan, a mechanism that agriculture machine used in various stages of production such as tractors and combine harvesters rely on rainfall rain, Otojd in the state silos to store grain with large capacity. It also has the largest market for private crop sesame crops, and sorghum.
The state is considered important for food security in Sudan's strategic center, so agriculture is the economic activity and often rely on rain for irrigation, as well as associated with agriculture and trade, including the border with Ethiopia and Eritrea trade in services.
With the introduction of the machine in agriculture in 1945 expanded the agricultural area until it reached 71,621,33 kilometers, while armed amounted to 2376563 forest five kilometers and contribute to the production of gum arabic from Sudan.
The distribution of agricultural areas on the following areas:
Belt dry Agriculture: is approximately 1.62792 million acres and is located in the north of line with rates ranging between 500 and 600 mm rain zone. Featuring Ptrepettha mud and lack of valleys and creeks and practiced mechanized farming in the form of a large sprawling fields.
Belt rainfed agriculture: the area of about 2,962.620 acres and range from a rainfall of 550 to 600 mm, the type of clay soil and permeate the home coves flat plains Mmaaada part adjacent to the River Rahad where it is exposed to Vidhanat.autamars where rain-fed agriculture in the form of large fields and other small about Alqryz and there are forests Reserve.
Water basins area: The area of about 1.58034 million acres, and permeate its soil Gedaref Hills series (tippers, gouge bees and Mount QNA) where water descends towards the clay soil land and water available.
Belt and mixed farming area of about 1.3924 million acres.
Protected areas: The total land area of about 176 630 acres
Watershed protected waters, and an area of about 878 180 acres.

The most important agricultural projects in the state are:

Agriculture Projects mechanism relies on rain-fed irrigation and rainfall, and those projects: Um Settat and sesame and Alvhqh and Labadi and others.
Rahad Agricultural Project irrigation and industrial uses of Nehralarhad.
The most important crops: sesame, maize, millet, gum arabic, sun flower and horticultural crops such as lemon, watermelon and vegetables such as tomatoes and okra, squash and others.

Forests

There are in Gedaref State Forest about 11 reserved the acacia trees prevail and produce gum arabic, along with 31 other reserved forest also dominated by acacia trees. And this forest tracts ranging from 100 to 800 acres.

Livestock

Livestock estimated in Gedaref State about 5 million head of cattle various factions and builds up to 7 million head in the rainy season when seasonal pasture available to the mandate and pilgrimage destination Shepherds their animals from the neighboring States in pursuit of pasture and water.

Industry

Industry in the state depend on agricultural products Kalsemsm, peanuts and sunflower Therefore, we find the most important industries represented in oils, soap and sweets industry. The factories are concentrated in the city of Gedaref. We are no workshops for the installation of tractors and harvesting combines and other agricultural machinery along with lathes that provide some spare parts and repair parts for machinery and rehabilitation service.

Services

Storage and processing of crops in grain silos and other stores.

Banking and banks 
The banking system, the state 24 branches of various banks which has 17 commercial and 7 specialized banks, in addition to the Bank of Sudan organizer of the banking activity and the supervisor of the application of the banking system of laws and policies of the central bank. 

The city of Gedaref eighteen branches of banks and three branches in FAO, and one branch each of the cities Alhawwath, acanthosis, Dawkah. The integration of Gedaref Investment Bank, which was established with the state savings bank in the framework of the policy of conciliation of Banks and adopted by the Central Bank of Sudan.
Technical and mechanical services related to agriculture and the fight against agricultural pests

Cities

Gedaref, the capital of the state, and the headquarters of the state government and the governor and represent the commercial center of the state, and all the urban services.
Acanthosis, and the largest market for livestock and quarry state veterinarian.
FAO, embracing presidency Rahad agricultural project also overlooking the road transit from Khartoum to Port Sudan.
Alhawwath, which is the capital of the province of Rahad and mediates gardener production area and going through the railway line heading towards Port Sudan across the city of Kassala.
Dawkah, the capital of the province of tippers and mediating agricultural production areas in the southeastern part of the state.
Tippers, it located on the Sudan-Ethiopian border and a center for cross-border trade to Ethiopia and across to all of Somalia and Djibouti in the event of Aaktmal continental road.
Gouge bees, and is located near the tourist Dinder National Park Reserve, one of the most promising cities after the discovery of signs of mineral wealth is in gold ore and natural gas.
Cottage cheese, one of the state's border localities.

Localities
El-Gadarif (capital)
Fao
Al-Hawwata
Doka
Gallabat
ُShowak, El-Fashaga
Gala-elnahal
Basonda
Elgorisha
Wasat Elqadarif

References

 
Qadarif